Nikol Kaletka (born 6 February 1995) is a Polish footballer who plays as a forward for Ekstraliga club KKPK Medyk Konin and the Poland women's national team.

References

External links

1995 births
Living people
Women's association football forwards
Polish women's footballers
Poland women's international footballers
Medyk Konin players